Tommi Tuovila (born 8 July 1971) is a Finnish archer. He competed in the men's individual and team events at the 1996 Summer Olympics.

References

External links
 

1971 births
Living people
Finnish male archers
Olympic archers of Finland
Archers at the 1996 Summer Olympics
People from Kuusamo
Sportspeople from North Ostrobothnia